Rafael "Rafa" Carlos Santacruz Aragonés (born 27 January 1983) is a Spanish footballer who plays mainly as a central defender for CD Pozoblanco.

Club career
Santacruz was born in Córdoba, Andalusia. After starting out at Real Valladolid B, he joined Valencia CF's reserves. On 10 April 2005, he made his first and only La Liga appearance with the latter's first team, playing the full 90 minutes in a 2–2 home draw against Málaga CF.

Subsequently, Santacruz spent one season apiece for Real Madrid's C and B sides, suffering relegation from the second division with the latter in 2007. After that, he returned to the third level and represented AD Ceuta, CD Linares and UB Conquense (one season each).

In the summer of 2010, the 27-year-old Santacruz returned to division two, joining Albacete Balompié. In the following transfer window, however, he left without one single official appearance and resumed his career in the third tier. He retired well into his 30s, having competed in Tercera División and the Andalusian regional leagues.

References

External links

1983 births
Living people
Footballers from Córdoba, Spain
Spanish footballers
Association football defenders
La Liga players
Segunda División players
Segunda División B players
Tercera División players
Divisiones Regionales de Fútbol players
Real Valladolid Promesas players
Valencia CF Mestalla footballers
Valencia CF players
Real Madrid C footballers
Real Madrid Castilla footballers
AD Ceuta footballers
CD Linares players
UB Conquense footballers
Albacete Balompié players
CE L'Hospitalet players
CD Puertollano footballers
CD Pozoblanco players
Lucena CF players
Spain youth international footballers